The Battle of Khushab took place in Khushab on 7 February 1857 and was the largest single engagement of the Anglo-Persian War. Having taken Borazjan without a fight, the British expeditionary army under Sir James Outram was withdrawing to Bushehr when it was ambushed by a smaller Persian force under Khanlar Mirza, drawn up in battle order to its rear. The battle ended with a British victory, whose troops returned to Bushehr.

The distinguishing action of the battle was the charge of the 3rd Bombay Light Cavalry (now amalgamated into The Poona Horse) against an infantry square of the 1st Khusgai Regiment of Fars, in which two Victoria Crosses were won. The recipients were the commander's adjutant Lieutenant Arthur Thomas Moore, who first broke into the square, and Captain John Grant Malcolmson, who then extricated Moore. Only twenty of the five hundred soldiers in the square escaped. Having beaten off the ambush, the British continued their withdrawal to Bushehr.

References

Sources
 
 

Khushab
Khushab
Khushab
History of Bushehr Province
Khushab
1857 in Iran
Anglo-Persian War
February 1857 events